The Collegiate Chapel of St John the Evangelist belongs to St John's College in the Auckland, New Zealand suburb of Meadowbank. Built from March 1847 and consecrated by Bishop Selwyn later that year, it was registered on 23 June 1983 by the New Zealand Historic Places Trust (now Heritage New Zealand) as a Category I historic place with registration number 13. It is the oldest surviving church building in Auckland. 

The chapel was designed by Frederick Thatcher and built at a cost of £330. The belfry was added in the early 1870s. In 1959, the Chapel was enlarged by extending it to the west and matched the original kauri and tōtara timber. The altar dates from 1934 and the altar candlesticks are made from wood from St Botolph's Church, Boston, Lincolnshire. The bell is made from metal from bells originally in York Minster.

References

Heritage New Zealand Category 1 historic places in the Auckland Region
1847 establishments in New Zealand
Education in Auckland
Anglican education
John the Evangelist
1840s architecture in New Zealand
Frederick Thatcher church buildings
University and college chapels